H. maculata may refer to:

 Haemanota maculata, a South American moth
 Haplonerita maculata, a Venezuelan moth
 Heteroscodra maculata, an African tarantula
 Hippobosca maculata, a parasitic fly
 Holbrookia maculata, a phrynosomid lizard
 Horia maculata, a blister beetle
 Hydroptila maculata, a purse-case caddisfly
 Hygrobia maculata, an aquatic beetle
 Hyla maculata, a tree frog
 Hyperplatys maculata, a longhorn beetle
 Hypochaeris maculata, a cat's ear